A dhol is a type of drum used in South Asia.

Dhol may also refer to:
 Caucasian dhol, a drum of the Caucasus
 Dhol (film), a 2007 Bollywood movie
 Dhol Faqeer (1921–1992), a famous mystic and folk singer of Sindh, Pakistan

See also
 Dohol, a drum used in Greater Iran
 The Dhol Foundation, a dhol drum institute in London and a musical group playing bhangra music
 Dohl, a German surname
 Dhool, several Indian films